Francis Mackenzie, was a Scottish member of the Plymouth Brethren Nazarene group, who travelled to Belgrade to start work for the British and Foreign Bible Society to foster religious observance among the people of Principality of Serbia. He stayed in Belgrade from 1876 till 1895.

Biography 
He settled there when the Turks left, as did many Austrians, Germans, Czechs, and Italians. He was a prominent figure in Belgrade society and a friend of many Serbian politicians including Čedomilj Mijatović, who was the Serbian Foreign Minister. Mackenzie became  very wealthy and influential and correctly predicted that Belgrade's city limits would spread eastwards.  In 1879, he bought a large piece of agricultural and swampy land named “Simić’s Majur” from the son of president/chairman of Serbian Parliament-Council Stojan Simić for 7500 Dukats (gold coins). He parceled it out into lots for selling and sold them much later when out of the money he earned, he built a large Peace Hall (Sala Mira) which was renowned for political events.  He was also known for policies such as not allowing restaurants on his land and forbidding smoking in all public places, which were generally disliked and eventually failed.Mackenzie contributed around eight thousand square meters of his land for the construction of the Temple of Saint Sava  . His and the names of his heirs were inscribed in the list of Great Benefactors, right after the members of the royal family and senior church dignitaries.

A street in Vračar was named after him: Francis Mackenzie Street ( or ).

Historical references 
Beogradske opštinske novine - Belgrade City Newspaper, 1894
Beograd-Izdanje opstine beogradske 1911
Zapisi starog Beogradjanina 2000
Iz starog Beograda - Zivorad P. Jovanovic, 1964
Siluete starog Beograda - Milan Jovanovic - Stojimirovic, 1971
Uspon Beograda, Milivoje M.Kostic, 2000
Beogradske gradske pijace, JKP Beogradske pijace, 1999
Vracarski glasnik, 1997-2004

References 

Scottish Methodist missionaries
Protestant missionaries in Serbia
Scottish evangelicals
1833 births
1895 deaths
British emigrants to Serbia
17th-century Scottish people
Methodist missionaries in Europe
Immigrants to the Principality of Serbia